Hong Kong C Team, also known as Hong Kong 09, was a Hong Kong football club established by the HKFA in 2007. It was dissolved only a year later.

Head coach
  Lai Sun Cheung (2007–2008)

References

Defunct football clubs in Hong Kong
Association football clubs established in 2007
Association football clubs disestablished in 2008
2007 establishments in Hong Kong
2008 disestablishments in Hong Kong